Jusep Torres Campalans is the "biography" of a fictitious Catalan painter written by Spanish novelist Max Aub and published in 1958. According to the book, during his stay in Paris Campalans became one of the co-founders of the Cubist movement. After the beginning of World War II, he is said to have moved to Mexico, where he spent the rest of his life as a recluse in Chiapas. The book even included a catalogue of his works (written by "H. R. Town") for a planned exhibition at the Tate Gallery in 1942 (which, of course, never materialized), with illustrations and photos. Parallels with Aub's life have been noted. The book is still often listed as a real biography.

References

1958 novels
20th-century Spanish novels
Novels about artists
Fictional Spanish people